Aulonemia trianae is a species of bamboo of the genus Aulonemia. It is part of the grass family and endemic to Latin America, with its native range in Columbia to Venezuela. It is most commonly found 8500 to 10500 feet above sea level.

References

trianae